Red Hot! "Live" - Very Live In Concert is a Sammy Hagar live album. The album combines the previous two live albums onto one CD. However, it does omit tracks from each of the albums. Thus, Young Girl Blues from All Night Long was omitted as was Trans Am Highway Wonderland and  This Planets On Fire from Live 1980.

Track listing
 "I've Done Everything for You"
 "Red"
 "Rock 'n' Roll Weekend"
 "Make It Last/Reckless"
 "Turn Up the Music"
 "Bad Motor Scooter"
 "Love or Money"
 "Plain Jane"
 "20th Century Man"
 "The Danger Zone"
 "Space Station #5"

References 

Sammy Hagar albums
1989 live albums